Skeneoides exilissima is a species of minute sea snail, a marine gastropod mollusk in the family Skeneidae.

Description
The size of the shell attains 1 mm.

Distribution
This species occurs in the western Mediterranean Sea off Algeria and Tunisia.

References

 Gofas, S.; Le Renard, J.; Bouchet, P. (2001). Mollusca, in: Costello, M.J. et al. (Ed.) (2001). European register of marine species: a check-list of the marine species in Europe and a bibliography of guides to their identification. Collection Patrimoines Naturels, 50: pp. 180–213

External links
 
 Philippi R. A., 1844: Enumeratio molluscorum Siciliae cum viventium tum in tellure tertiaria fossilium, quae in itinere suo observavit. Vol. 2; Eduard Anton, Halle [Halis Saxorum iv + 303 p., pl. 13–28]
 Ancey, C. F. (1898). List of marine shells collected at Port Gueydon, Kabylia, with description of a new Cyclostrema. The Nautilus. 12(5): 52-57
 Fekih M. & Gougerot L. ("1974" 1977). Liste commentée des gastéropodes testacés marins recueillis dans les dépots littoraux actuels du Golfe de Tunis. Bulletin de l'Institut National Scientifique et Technique d'Océanographie et de Pêche de Salammbo. 3 (1-4): 165-232
 Nofroni, I. & Renda, W. (2021). Reestablishment of the name Skeneoides formosissima (Brugnone, 1973 [sic) instead of S. jeffreysii (Monterosato, 1872) nomen nudum (Gastropoda Vetigastropoda Skeneidae). Biodiversity Journal. 12(4): 841–846.]
 Warén A. (1992). New and little known "Skeneimorph" gastropods from the Mediterranean Sea and the adjacent Atlantic Ocean. Bollettino Malacologico 27(10-12): 149-248, 

Skeneidae
Gastropods described in 1844